Destiny is the seventh studio solo album released by Cuban-American singer Gloria Estefan, but is the nineteenth of her career overall. It shipped 1.6 million copies worldwide in its first month of release.

Production and release 
The album features a more ambient sound than previous Estefan albums, with only two songs, "You'll Be Mine (Party Time)" and "Higher", being upbeat. The album includes a bonus enhanced selection, in which Estefan talks about the album and the song "Reach" in particular. It also features an animated discography of Estefan.

The first single from the album, "Reach", became a hit around the world and was the official theme of the 1996 Summer Olympics in Atlanta.

Commercial performance
The album placed at #116 on the Billboard Year-End chart and as of 2005 it has sold 877,000 copies in United States according to Nielsen Soundscan. 
According to Billboard, It was one of Sony Music's best selling records in the first quarter revenue of 1996, selling over 1.6 million copies worldwide.

Track listing

Personnel 

 Davnda Afaolbi – vocals
 Davonda Afolabi – choir
 Gloria Agostini – harp
 Donna Allen – vocals (background)
 Marcelo Anez – engineer
 Julien Barber – viola
 Diane Barere – cello
 Elena Barere – violin
 Randy Barlow – trumpet
 Mike Bassie – rap
 John Beale – violin
 Carol Becker – vocals
 Joseph Bongiorno – bass
 Edwin Bonilla – percussion
 Francisco Anthony Del - drum programming
 April Brown – violin
 Avril Brown – violin
 Ed Calle – saxophone
 Jorge Casas – bass, guitar, arranger, producer, chant, mandocello, tres, orchestration, production coordination, muted banjo
 Sean Chambers – engineer
 David Chappell – strings
 Huifang Chen – strings
 Charles Christopher – vocals (background)
 Tony Concepcion – trumpet
 Mike Couzzi – engineer
 Sal Cuevas – bass
 Matt Curry – assistant
 Jill Dell'Abate – contractor
 Lawrence Dermer – guitar, percussion, piano, arranger, keyboards, organ (hammond), vocals (background), producer, bata, fender rhodes, horn arrangements, string arrangements
 Sharon Diacheysn – vocals
 John DiPuccio – strings
 Nancy Donald – art direction
 Charles Dye – engineer
 Emilio Estefan, Jr. – arranger, producer, executive producer
 Gloria Estefan – arranger, vocals (background)
 Mary Helen Ewing – viola
 Joan Faigen – strings
 Chembo Febles – percussion, percussion (African), chant
 John Feeney – violin
 Guillermo Figueroa – violin
 Narcisco Figueroa – violin
 Guillermo Figueron – violin
 Barry Finclair – bass, violin
 Shaun Fisher – vocals
 Pablo Flores – mixing
 Cecelia Hobbs Gardner – violin
 Crystal Garner – viola
 Hector Garrido – conductor, director, organ (hammond), orchestration
 Javier Garza – engineer
 Andy Goldman – guitar
 Paolo Gualano – percussion, drums, surdo, drums (snare)
 Joyce Hammann – violin
 Kate Harrington – hair stylist
 Kris Kello – arranger, keyboards, vocals (background)
 Bakithi Khumalo – bass
 Sebastián Krys – engineer
 Bakithi Kumalo – bass, chant
 Phil Lakofsky – strings, cello
 Carol Landon – viola
 Jeanne LeBlanc – cello
 Charles Libove – violin
 Mei Mei Lin – strings
 Richard Locker – cello
 Daniel Lopez – percussion, handclapping
 Dante Luciani – trombone
 Bob Ludwig – mastering
 Juan R. Marquez – classic guitar
 Nancy McAlhany – violin
 Andrew Melick – photography
 Rick Melverne – vocals
 Homer Mensch – bass
 Heidi Modr – violin
 Sarah Moore – vocals
 Richard Morris – vocals
 Rick Morris – choir
 Doug Mountain – digital mixing
 Eugene J. Moye – cello
 Jan Mullen – violin
 Craig Mumm – viola
 David Nadien – violin
 Jorge Noriega – vocals (background)
 Mario Ochoa – percussion
 Alfredo Oliva – strings
 Gene Orloff – violin
 Clay Ostwald – arranger, keyboards, producer, chant
 Caryl Paisner – cello
 Sandra Park – violin
 Paul Peabody – violin
 Scott Perry – engineer
 Freddy Piñero, Jr. – programming, engineer, assistant
 John Pintavalle – violin
 Cheito Quinonez – vocals (background), guiro
 Serena Radaelli – hair stylist
 Dave Reitzas – engineer, mixing
 Herb Ritts – photography
 Robert Rozek – strings
 Kike Santander – bass, guitar, percussion, arranger, keyboards, handclapping, producer, horn arrangements, vocal effect
 Mike Scaglione – saxophone
 Eric Schilling – engineer
 Mark Orrin Schuman – cello
 Laura Seaton – violin
 Richard Sortomme – violin
 Debbie Spring – viola
 Steve Svensson – strings
 Marti Sweet – bass
 Ron Taylor – engineer
 Ron Taylor – engineer
 Dana Teboe – trombone
 Donna Tecco – violin
 Rene Toledo – guitar
 Alberto Tolot – photography
 Francesca Tolot – make-up
 Michelle Vandenbos – choir
 Deborah Waknin – hair stylist
 Ellen Westerman – cello
 Eric Wyric – violin
 Joe Zeytoonian – saz, oud

Charts

Weekly charts

Year-end charts

Certifications and sales

Release history

References

External links 
 Gloria Estefan discography database

1996 albums
Gloria Estefan albums
Albums produced by Emilio Estefan

pl:Gloria!